The Master is the second solo album by American rapper Rakim, released November 30, 1999, on Universal Records. It serves as the follow-up to Rakim's debut solo album, The 18th Letter (1997), and would be Rakim's last studio album for nearly a decade, until 2009's The Seventh Seal.

Critical reception

The Master received generally positive to mixed reviews from music critics.

Track listing

Samples
"Flow Forever" samples "Since We Said Goodbye" by The Counts
"When I B on Tha Mic" samples "What the World Needs Now Is Love" by The Artistics, "The Saga Begins" by Rakim, "How About Some Hardcore" and "World Famous" by M.O.P., "Peter Piper" by Run-DMC, "Blind Alley" by The Emotions and "Metal Thangz" by Street Smartz feat. O.C. and Pharoahe Monch
"Finest Ones" samples "We Belong Together" by The Spinners and "High Power Rap" by Crash Crew
"I Know" samples "Let's Straighten It Out" by Latimore and "Steppin' Out" by Steel Pulse
"It's the R" samples "Mother's Son" by Curtis Mayfield, "Tru Master" by Pete Rock feat. Inspectah Deck and Kurupt and "As the Rhyme Goes On", "Follow the Leader", "I Know You Got Soul" by Eric B. & Rakim
"I'll Be There" samples "I'll Be With You" by Grover Washington, Jr.
"Real Shit" samples "Survival of the Fittest" by Mobb Deep
"How I Get Down" samples "Funky Drummer" by James Brown
"Waiting for the World to End" samples "Brooks' 50c Tour (Main Title Collage)" by Quincy Jones, "Save Me" by Bloodstone, "All Night" by Xperadó and "Microphone Fiend" by Eric B. & Rakim
"We'll Never Stop" samples "The New Rap Language" by Spoonie Gee and The Treacherous Three

Charts

Album

Singles

Notes

References

External links
 
 The Master at Discogs
 Album Review at The Harvard Crimson
 Album Review at The Independent
 Album Review at RapReviews

1999 albums
Albums produced by Clark Kent (producer)
Albums produced by DJ Premier
Rakim albums
Universal Records albums